Verkhovsky (masculine), Verkhovskaya (feminine), or Verkhovskoye (neuter) is the name of several rural localities in Russia:
Verkhovsky (rural locality), a settlement in Yarnemsky Selsoviet of Plesetsky District of Arkhangelsk Oblast
Verkhovskoye, Kaluga Oblast, a village in Maloyaroslavetsky District of Kaluga Oblast
Verkhovskoye, Krasnodar Krai, a selo in Razdolsky Rural Okrug of the City of Sochi, Krasnodar Krai
Verkhovskoye, Nizhny Novgorod Oblast, a selo in Khmelevitsky Selsoviet of Shakhunya, Nizhny Novgorod Oblast
Verkhovskoye, Novgorod Oblast, a village in Yegolskoye Settlement of Borovichsky District of Novgorod Oblast
Verkhovskaya, Arkhangelsk Oblast, a village in Malodorsky Selsoviet of Ustyansky District of Arkhangelsk Oblast
Verkhovskaya, Kemerovo Oblast, a village in Bekovskaya Rural Territory of Belovsky District of Kemerovo Oblast
Verkhovskaya, Komi Republic, a village in Zamezhnaya selo Administrative Territory of Ust-Tsilemsky District of the Komi Republic
Verkhovskaya, Nizhny Novgorod Oblast, a village in Khmelevitsky Selsoviet of Shakhunya, Nizhny Novgorod Oblast